Alderton is a census-designated place (CDP) in Pierce County, Washington, United States. The population was 2,893 at the 2010 census.  The community is located in the Puyallup River Valley between the cities of Sumner and Orting.

Geography
Alderton is located at  (47.169444, -122.229167).

Mount Rainier

The city sits in a fertile valley b the Puyallup. It is built entirely on several layers of lahar deposits. Based on studies of past lahar flow and the mountain's structure, the Orting plains of the Puyallup River is designated an at-risk community from Mount Rainier's lahar activity; scientists predict that lahar could reach Orting in 30 minutes and Alderton in an hour. The Mount Rainier Volcano Lahar Warning System has installed sirens throughout the area, activated by sensors on Mount Rainier.

History
The valley where Alderton is located is within the traditional lands of the Puyallup Tribe and the Muckleshoot Tribes. The Puyallup people are one of the Salish people who inhabited the Puget Sound lowlands. They lived by fishing, hunting, and gathering. Salmon are the most significant food source and are held in reverence and incorporated into the traditional ceremony. Permanent villages were located along the riverbank. The Puyallup River valley was an important trading center for many tribes. 

The first emigrant wagons arrived in Pierce County in 1853. Some came by way of the Naches Pass trail, a short-cut of the Oregon Trail. Many settled in the Puyallup River valley area including the Woolery and Lane families. The Naches Trail, which led many early emigrants to Pierce County.  The route passed through Alderton and McMillin along the Military Road. It split at Alderton, heading west towards Olympia or north towards Seattle.
Homesteaders cleared the land and created subsistence farms which typically included fields where oats, rye, and barley, potatoes, peas, or other vegetables were planted, and pasture for livestock, and orchards with a variety of fruit trees were established. Orson M. Annis (1828-1900) settled in Alderton in 1969.  The post office was established at Alderton on April 12, 1878 and closed on October 9, 1964. The vacant brick gymnasium and school building were built in 1915, visible along Military Road (Washington Route 162 at its junction with North 96th Street East.  The old General Store stands across N 96th E, south of the school.  Two historic farms continue to operate, the Spooner Farm since 1930 and the Cavelti Farm since 1938.

According to the United States Census Bureau, the CDP has a total area of 5.46 square miles (8.4 km), of which, 5.32 square miles (8.3 km) of it is land and 0.14 square miles (0.08 km) of it (2.55%) is water.

In February 2015, the Tacoma News Tribune reported two families, Sidhu and Alderton LLC, purchased 116 acres of Alderton farmland located  near the Puyallup River and Ball Creek. While Alderton LLC grows mostly Christmas trees, Sidhu grows fruits and vegetables.

References

Census-designated places in Pierce County, Washington
Census-designated places in Washington (state)
Populated places in Pierce County, Washington